The Hôtel de La Mamye in Toulouse, France, is a Renaissance hôtel particulier (palace) of the 16th century.

History
It was built from 1540 for N. de La Mamye and redesigned throughout the 16th century for its descendants, the councilor to the Parliament Guillaume de La Mamye, then Pierre de La Mamye.

The most interesting parts of the hotel are visible in the inner courtyard and date from the 1540s. Large Doric, Ionic and then Corinthian columns follow one another at each level of the elevation, recalling prestigious Roman monuments such as the Colosseum or the Theater of Marcellus. In the courtyard also stands a large polygonal Renaissance stair tower.

The building is organized around a courtyard and a garden. The elevations are of brick, the stone is reserved for the frames of the bays, except for the south elevation of the court entirely in stone.

Pictures

See also 
 Renaissance architecture of Toulouse

Bibliography 
 Guy Ahlsell de Toulza, Louis Peyrusse, Bruno Tollon, Hôtels et Demeures de Toulouse et du Midi Toulousain, Daniel Briand éditeur, Drémil Lafage, 1997
 Jules Chalande, « Histoire des rues de Toulouse », Mémoires de l'Académie des Sciences et Belles-Lettres de Toulouse, 11e série, tome II, Toulouse, 1914, .

External links 

 Nathalie Prat and Colin Debuiche, « Fiche d'information détaillée Patrimoine Architectural: IA31116346 », website Urban-Hist, Archives de Toulouse, 1996 et 2011

Houses completed in the 16th century
Buildings and structures in Toulouse
Renaissance architecture in Toulouse
Hôtels particuliers in Toulouse